Chaim Goodman-Strauss (born June 22, 1967 in Austin TX) is an American mathematician who works in convex geometry, especially aperiodic tiling. He is on the faculty of the University of Arkansas and is a co-author with John H. Conway of The Symmetries of Things, a comprehensive book surveying the mathematical theory of patterns.

Education and career
Goodman-Strauss received both his B.S. (1988) and Ph.D. (1994) in mathematics from the University of Texas at Austin. His doctoral advisor was John Edwin Luecke. He joined the faculty at the University of Arkansas, Fayetteville (UA) in 1994 and served as departmental chair from 2008 to 2015. He held visiting positions at the  National Autonomous University of Mexico and at Princeton University.

During 1995 he did research at The Geometry Center, a mathematics research and education center at the University of Minnesota, where he investigated aperiodic tilings of the plane.

Goodman-Strauss has been fascinated by patterns and mathematical paradoxes for as long as he can remember. He attended a lecture about the mathematician Georg Cantor when he was 17 and says, "I was already doomed to be a mathematician, but that lecture sealed my fate." He became a mathematics writer and popularizer. From 2004 to 2012, in conjunction with KUAF 91.3 FM, the University of Arkansas NPR affiliate, he presented ”The Math Factor", a podcast website dealing with recreational mathematics. He is an admirer of Martin Gardner and is on the Advisory Council of Gathering 4 Gardner, an organization that celebrates the legacy of the famed mathematics popularizer and Scientific American columnist, and is particularly active in the associated Celebration of Mind events.

Mathematical artist
In 2008 Goodman-Strauss teamed up with J. H. Conway and Heidi Burgiel to write The Symmetries of Things, an exhaustive and reader accessible overview of the mathematical theory of patterns. He produced hundreds of full-color images for this book using software that he developed for the purpose.  The Mathematical Association of America said, "The first thing one notices when one picks up a copy … is that it is a beautiful book … filled with gorgeous color pictures … many of which were generated by Goodman-Strauss. Unlike some books which add in illustrations to keep the reader's attention, the pictures are genuinely essential to the topic of this book."

He also creates large-scale sculptures inspired by mathematics, and some of these have been featured at Gathering 4 Gardner conferences.

Books
 2008 The symmetries of things (with by John H. Conway and Heidi Burgiel). A. K. Peters, Wellesley, MA, 2008,

Papers
 "Matching Rules and Substitution Tilings", Annals of Mathematics, Second Series, Vol 147, Issue 1 (January 1998), pp. 181–223
 "A Small Aperiodic Set of Planar Tiles" European Journal of Combinatorics, Vol 20, Issue 5, (July 1999) pp. 375–384
 "Compass and Straightedge in the Poincaré Disk" American Mathematical Monthly Vol. 108 (January 2001), pp. 38–49
 "Can’t Decide? Undecide!" Notices of the American Mathematical Society Vol. 57 (March 2010), pp. 343–356
 "A strongly aperiodic set of tiles in the hyperbolic plane" Inventiones Mathematicae, Vol 159, Issue 1 (2005), pp. 119–132
 "Lots of Aperiodic Sets of Tiles", Journal of Combinatorial Theory, Series A, Vol 160 (November 2018), pp. 409–445

References

External links
 
 Personal web page
 "Shaping Surfaces" [Video] Address to National Museum of Mathematics (MoMath) on December 3, 2014

Mathematics popularizers
Recreational mathematicians
20th-century American mathematicians
21st-century American mathematicians
People from Austin, Texas
University of Texas at Austin College of Liberal Arts alumni
University of Arkansas faculty
Geometers
Mathematical artists
Scientific illustrators
Combinatorialists
Topologists
1967 births
Living people